Qasemabad (also Romanized as Qāsemābād) is a village in Tolbozan Rural District, Golgir District, Masjed Soleyman County, Khuzestan Province, Iran. At the 2006 census, its population was 105, in 18 families.

References 

Populated places in Masjed Soleyman County